Farlane railway station is located in the community of Farlane in Unorganized Kenora District in northwestern Ontario, Canada. The station is on the Canadian National Railway transcontinental main line and is in use by Via Rail as a stop for transcontinental  Canadian trains.

The station was built in the 1920s, mainly to serve recreational cottage community around Farlane and nearby lakes which were only accessible by rail. Located at Mile 113.4 of the Redditt Subdivision of the Canadian National, it was built as a standard Design No. 3 of the National Transcontinental Railway, it was typical of stations intended for remote cottage communities, it contained a waiting room, baggage and an operator's telegraph bay. The station has been unstaffed for many years but received some maintenance from cottagers to serve as a shelter with a bench for train passengers.

References

External links
 Via Rail: Farlane railway station

Via Rail stations in Ontario
Railway stations in Kenora District
Canadian National Railway stations in Ontario